Linnet may refer to:
 Common linnet, 	Carduelis cannabina
 Yemen linnet, 	Carduelis yemenensis
 Warsangli linnet, Carduelis johannis
 Linnet Ridgeway-Doyle, main character in Death on the Nile novel by Agatha Christie.

See also
, the name of nine ships of the Royal Navy
, the name of three ships of the US Navy, and one planned one

Animal common name disambiguation pages